Anything is the seventh studio album by U.K. punk rock band the Damned, released by MCA Records in 1986. On the album's release, it charted in the United Kingdom, peaking at No. 40, and was certified as silver by the British Phonographic Industry. Four singles were released that all charted in the UK.

Production

The album began production in June 1986 in Puk Recording Studios in Denmark. The Damned's vocalist, Dave Vanian, later stated that the group were forced into the studio to record the album before they had prepared any new material for it. Drummer Rat Scabies mentioned that the group had demoed the song "In Dulce Decorum", but most of the songs were written in the studio. In July, the group took a break from recording to perform a 10th anniversary performance in London at the Town and Country Club and two in Finsbury Park, where the group performed some songs that would appear on Anything, and were joined by Captain Sensible to perform "Smash It Up". On returning to Denmark, the group recorded a cover of "Alone Again Or" which Scabies originally thought was written by Roman Jugg. The album concluded production in August.

Release and tour
Following the recording sessions, the Damned toured Ireland and Britain in October and concluded the tour in Ireland in November. The group began having issues with technology on the tour (the brass parts of "Psychomania" crept in when the group were performing "In Dulce Decorum") and had to use an emulator to recreate some of their studio sound. Prior to the album's release, a single for "Anything" was released in November.

Anything was released on MCA Records on 1 December 1986 in the United Kingdom. In the UK, the album charted for two weeks, peaking at No. 40. It was certified Silver by the British Phonographic Industry. After the release of the "Gigolo" single in January 1987, the Damned toured Europe until February. They toured in Australia in March and Japan in April. During a booking hiatus, the group returned to performing shows as the alter ego Naz Nomad and the Nightmares. "In Dulce Decorum" was released as the final single from the album in November 1987.

In the United States, MCA released "Anything", "In Dulce Decorum" and "Alone Again" as singles. MCA followed the release of Anything with a Damned compilation album titled Light at the End of the Tunnel in November 1987. MCA and The Damned parted ways the following year.

Reception

The Ottawa Citizen gave the album a positive review, describing the album as "varied but not disjointed" and that the Damned had become a "superb pop band" that make a "better pop band of the '80s than it did a punk band of the '70s". The Vancouver Sun also praised the album, stating that the Damned "have made the switch to mood music quite well, almost rising to the level of the mighty Stranglers". The review compared the album to music by Simple Minds, opining that the album was what they "want to sound like, moody and atmospheric without getting all doomy and gloomy".

A retrospective review from AllMusic was negative, awarding the album 2 stars and calling it the worst album of the original group's catalogue. The review specifically pointed out "Restless" and "In Dulce Decorum" as meandering, and noted that the tracks "Psychomania" and "Anything" were the only tracks that "generate anything approximating the energy of the Damned's best music".

When later asked about the Phantasmagoria and Anything albums, Vanian said that "some of the production in retrospect could have been done a little better, but it was the '80's. Some of those songs were just as heartfelt as anything that had gone before despite the frills and ruffles".

Track listing

Personnel

The Damned
Dave Vanian  – lead vocals
Roman Jugg  – guitars, keyboards, vocals
Bryn Merrick  – bass, vocals
Rat Scabies  – drums
 Additional musicians
Blue Weaver  – keyboards
Paul "Shirley" Shepley  – keyboards
Paul Wickens  – keyboards
Suzie O'List  – backing vocals
Kurt Holm  – trumpet

 Production
Jon Kelly  – production, engineering, mixing (2, 7, 9)
Henrik Nilsson – additional engineering
Lance Phillips – additional engineering
Alan O'Duffy – additional engineering
Ken Thomas  – mixing (3, 6, 8)
Nigel Walker  – mixing (1, 4, 5)
Howard Raybould  – album cover carving
Jef Hartley – album cover painting
Booce – album cover painting
The Leisure Process – design, art direction
Nick Knight – photography

Charts

Certifications

Notes

References

 

1986 albums
The Damned (band) albums
Albums produced by Jon Kelly
MCA Records albums